Amritanshu Gupta is an Indian radio journalist known for his high-profile radio campaigns.

Notable campaigns
Gupta first came into the public eye when, inspired by the film My Name is Khan, he staged a campaign to meet Bollywood star Shah Rukh Khan.  Supported by Indian radio station Red FM, Gupta tracked Khan across Mumbai in an effort to meet him. He finally took to camping outside Shah Rukh Khan's home in Mannat for three days until Khan relented and agreed to meet Gupta.  The meeting resulted in a very candid interview that was aired on Red FM.

Gupta continued his association with Red FM, launching an investigative campaign titled "Jaasoos" in which he did a series of sting operations, and then played a pivotal role in an interview series titled "Red Arrest", which won the best media campaign award at the India Radio Forum Awards 2012.

Gupta left Red FM for Fever 104 FM, where he launched a campaign to have a road in Delhi named for Sachin Tendulkar, the legendary cricketer.  , the campaign has not achieved its desired result.

Other campaigns
In June 2012, Gupta produced the program "The day a common man wanted to stand for the Indian Presidential election", which was recognized by New York Festivals as the Best Human Interest story in its 2013 World's Best Radio awards. In this campaign Gupta demonstrated the power of the Indian Constitution by making a common man stand for the Indian Presidential Elections.

Then, in a campaign called "Mission Rihayee", he helped a prisoner who had been languishing in Delhi's Tihar Jail for committing a petty crime and being unable to pay the penalty which came with the jail sentence. Gupta not only helped free him but also helped him in getting a job.

This was followed by a campaign in which he helped an HIV positive victim fight discrimination and find a house in Delhi.  In the process, Gupta helped the man reunite with his family.
This Program got Gupta an award for the best Community Service at the 2013 New York Festivals.

In the aftermath of the devastating Uttarakhand floods, Gupta helped rescue a family which was stranded there, ensuring that the Uttarakhand Chief Minister himself looked into the matter.

References

Indian radio journalists
Living people
Year of birth missing (living people)
Place of birth missing (living people)